Trinity Gardens  is a suburb of Adelaide, South Australia. The name is taken from Holy Trinity Church.

History
The land came to be known as Trinity Glebe.

North Norwood Post Office opened around 1886, was renamed Trinity Gardens in 1950 and St Morris in 1963, when the second Trinity Gardens office opened in the present area of the suburb.

Trinity Gardens is in the City of Norwood Payneham St Peters local government area, the South Australian House of Assembly Electoral district of Dunstan and the Australian House of Representatives Division of Sturt.

References

 

Suburbs of Adelaide